Antonio de León y Becerra (1631 – August 28, 1708) was a Roman Catholic prelate who served as the Bishop of Arequipa (1677–1708), the Bishop of Trujillo (1676–1677), and the Bishop of Panamá (1672–1676).

Biography
Antonio de León y Becerra was born in Madrid, Spain and ordained a priest in 1657. On March 21, 1672, he was appointed by the King of Spain and confirmed by Pope Clement X as Bishop of Panamá. On July 29, 1673, he was consecrated bishop by Antonio Sanz Lozano, Bishop of Cartagena. On March 31, 1676, he was appointed by the King of Spain and confirmed October 19, 1676 by Pope Innocent XI as Bishop of Trujillo. On June 14, 1677, he was appointed by the King of Spain and confirmed by Pope Innocent XI as Bishop of Arequipa. He served as Bishop of Arequipa until his death on August 28, 1708.

References

External links and additional sources
 (for Chronology of Bishops) 
 (for Chronology of Bishops) 
 (for Chronology of Bishops) 
 (for Chronology of Bishops) 

1631 births
1708 deaths
Bishops appointed by Pope Clement X
Bishops appointed by Pope Innocent XI
17th-century Roman Catholic bishops in Panama
17th-century Roman Catholic bishops in Peru
Roman Catholic bishops of Panamá
Roman Catholic bishops of Arequipa
Roman Catholic bishops of Trujillo